The 1996 Mobiline Cellulars season was the seventh season of the franchise in the Philippine Basketball Association (PBA). The team was formerly known as Pepsi Mega in the All-Filipino Cup.

Draft pick

Occurrences
Pepsi tried to sell its franchise to Duty Free Shoppers Inc. but the PBA Board stepped in and prevented the transaction because the Lorenzos were not major owners of Duty Free. 

The first month of the year during the off-season, Pepsi Mega tendered an offer sheet to Sunkist's Al Solis for three years amounting to P9.36 million. RFM through Team Manager Elmer Yanga said the club was not honoring the offer sheet of Pepsi since Al Solis signed a new contract with the Juicers in the middle of 1995. The PBA on the other hand considers Pepsi's offer sheet legal than the supposed "contract or agreement" signed by Solis with Sunkist binding. Upon consultation with their lawyers, RFM announced in the press conference they are suing Solis because he signed the offer sheet of Pepsi without informing the management which RFM claimed was done in bad faith.  

Pepsi's franchise was transferred to Lapanday Holdings Corporation, the holding company of the family of Luis "Moro" Lorenzo, it is said that the company was also owned by the Cojuangco family. The team was renamed Mobiline Cellulars beginning the Commissioner's Cup. Pagemart Philippines, Inc., a telecoms marketing company affiliated with the Lapanday Holdings and Pilipino Telephone Corporation (PILTEL) was tasked to select a new team name and negotiations have been finalized for the use of Mobiline’s brand name.

Notable dates
February 20: Rookie Peter Martin sink two free throws with 13.4 seconds left as Pepsi rallies and send Ginebra San Miguel into a record-tying 18-game losing streak in a 98-94 win, spoiling the debut of highly touted Ginebra rookie Marlou Aquino. 

June 18: The Cellulars leaned on a big fourth quarter surge to defeat defending champion Sunkist, 89-83, for their first and only win in the Commissioners Cup. 

October 8: Mobiline scored its first victory in the Governors Cup with a 127-92 rout over Purefoods Corned Beef Cowboys. Import Derrick Canada posted a triple-double of 38 points, 10 rebounds and 11 assists.

Roster

Transactions

Trades

Additions

Recruited imports

References

TNT Tropang Giga seasons
Mobiline